Nembrotha megalocera is a species of colourful sea slug, a dorid nudibranch, a marine gastropod mollusk in the family Polyceridae. It was first described in 1990.

Distribution
This species is known from the Red Sea.

Description
Nembrotha megalocera is a large black and orange-yellow nembrothid that grows to at least 45 mm in length. It has a blue foot. The rhinophores are red and purple and the gill stalks are white and yellow.

Ecology
Nembrotha megalocera eats colonial ascidians.

References

External links
 

Polyceridae
Gastropods described in 1990